Artsivi (Eagle) Gorge Natural Monument consists of two sites: limestone rock canyon and nearby forested area, where in the 5th century Khornabuji fortress was built. Sites are located in Dedoplistsqaro Municipality,  Georgia  and incorporated in Vashlovani Protected Areas.

Eagle gorge is located 2 km from the city of Dedoplistsqaro on the limestone rock massive.  Here is the only local endemic species of Georgia - Campanula kachetica, rare species of Globularia trichosantha, Galium pedemontanum and rare oriental thuja (Biota orientalis), which is not available in any other corner of Georgia.  Eagle gorge is also distinguished by more than sixty varieties  birds, including nesting rare species of birds - black stork and Griffon vulture.  Eagle canyon is an ideal place for birdwatching.

See also 
 List of natural monuments of Georgia
Khornabuji Castle

References

Natural monuments of Georgia (country)
Kakheti
Protected areas established in 1935
1935 establishments in the Soviet Union